Lucie Hradecká and Michaëlla Krajicek were the defending champions, however Krajicek chose not to participate. Hradecká partnered Andrea Hlaváčková but withdrew before their quarterfinal match.

The Ukrainian-twins Lyudmyla Kichenok and Nadiia Kichenok won the title, defeating the French-duo Stéphanie Foretz and Amandine Hesse in the final, 6–2, 6–3.

Seeds

Draw

References 
 Draw

Open GDF Suez Nantes Atlantique - Doubles